Emurena luridoides is a moth of the family Erebidae first described by Walter Rothschild in 1910. It is found in Brazil.

References

Phaegopterina
Arctiinae of South America
Moths described in 1910